The 2018–19 season was Yeovil Town Ladies Football Club's second consecutive season in the top-flight of English women's football, the Women's Super League, in which they finished bottom. They also competed in the Women's FA Cup and Women's League Cup, in which they were eliminated in the fourth round and group stage respectively.

Season summary
In June 2018, Lee Burch was appointed as head coach, after Jamie Sherwood stood down at the end of the previous season.

In March 2019, the club was reported to have entered administration. They were deducted 10 points during the 2018–19 season, finishing 15 points adrift and getting relegated. However, in May 2019, they were denied an operating licence for the Championship and would have to contest the following season as a third tier club instead. In June 2019, owner Steve Allinson announced his intention to relinquish ownership of the team free of charge in order to find investors capable of sustaining the team. Burch left the club in June 2019.

Competitions

Women's Super League

League table

Matches

Women's FA Cup

Women's League Cup

Group stage

Player statistics

References

Yeovil Town
Yeovil Town L.F.C.